Trent Knorr is a Canadian ice hockey linesman.

Knorr worked his first professional game in the ECHL as a linesman when he was 18 years old.

Knorr worked in the Western Hockey League until 2013. He acted as a linesman at the 2010 Memorial Cup in Brandon, Manitoba.

Knorr made his NHL debut on November 13, 2013, officiating a match-up at the Xcel Energy Center between the Toronto Maple Leafs and Minnesota Wilds. He has also worked as a linesman in the 2013-14 NHL season, debuting as such on February 26, 2014 at Pepsi Center when the Colorado Avalanche took on the Los Angeles Kings; through March 11 he has worked five NHL matches as a linesman. Starting in the 2015-16 season, Knorr works as a full-time NHL linesman.

Knorr is a former player for the Victoria Cougars.

References

National Hockey League officials
Living people
Year of birth missing (living people)